Timasitheus may refer to:
 Timasitheus of Croton was an ancient Greek athlete of wrestling
 Timasitheus of Delphi was an ancient Greek athlete of pancratium
 Timasitheus of Lipara, first archon of the city of Lipara
 Timasitheus of Trapezus, a translator from Asia Minor mentioned in Xenophon's Anabasis

See also

 
 Gaius Furius Sabinius Aquila Timesitheus (died 243), Roman knight of the 3rd century who was the most important advisor to Gordian III